Chandra Saradavara, Princess of Phichit (15 April 1873 – 21 February 1905), was a Princess of Siam (later Thailand). She was a member of Siamese Royal Family. She is a daughter of Chulalongkorn, King Rama V of Siam.

Her mother was Princess Saovabhak Nariratana, daughter of Prince Ladavalya, the Prince Bhumindrabhakdi and Mom Chin Ladavalya na Ayudhya. She was given full name by her father as Chandra Saradavara Varolanlaksanasombati Ratanarajakumari

For the royal duties, she was one of the executive vice-president of the Red Unalom Society, the major humanitarian organisation (later Thai Red Cross Society), founded by Queen Savang Vadhana as maternal patron. And Queen Saovabha Phongsri was appointed the first president, and Thanpuying Plien Phasakoravongs acted as the society secretary. She worked as the executive vice-president with the other princesses;

 Queen Sukhumala Marasri
 Princess Suddha Dibyaratana, Princess Sri Ratanakosindra
 Princess Yaovamalaya Narumala, Princess of Sawankalok
 Princess Srivilailaksana, Princess of Suphanburi
 Princess Ubolratana Narinaka, Princess of Akaravorarajgalya
 Princess Saisavalibhirom, Princess of Suddhasininat Piyamaharaj Padivaradda
 The Noble Consort (Chao Chom Manda) Kesorn of King Chulalongkorn

On 12 March 1904, she was given the royal title from her father as, The Princess of Phichit, or translated in Thai as Krom Khun Phichit Jessadachandra. She was given the rank of Krom Khun, the 4th level of the Krom ranks.

Princess Chandra Saradavara died on 21 February 1905, while going to pay respect to her stepsister's funeral, Princess Srivilailaksana at Bang Pa-In Royal Palace, Ayutthaya Province.

Royal decorations
   Dame of The Most Illustrious Order of the Royal House of Chakri
  Dame Cross of the Most Illustrious Order of Chula Chom Klao (First class): received 26 November 1893

Ancestry

References
 Royal Command of giving title HRH Princess Chandra Saradavara, the Princess of Phichit
 Death of HRH Princess Chandra Saradavara
 Executive Vice-President of Thai Red Cross Society

1873 births
1905 deaths
19th-century Thai people
19th-century Thai women
20th-century Thai women
19th-century Chakri dynasty
20th-century Chakri dynasty
Thai female Chao Fa
Order of Chula Chom Klao
Children of Chulalongkorn
Thai female Phra Ong Chao
Daughters of kings